William Walter Suggs, Jr. (May 15, 1939 – September 5, 2022) was a college and professional American football player. An offensive and defensive lineman, he played college football at Mississippi State University, and played professionally in the American Football League (AFL) for the Houston Oilers from 1962 through 1969, and for the National Football League (NFL) Oilers in 1970 and 1971.  Suggs played in 137 consecutive games.  He played in the first pro football game played in the Houston Astrodome in 1967. He was an American Football League All-Star in 1967 and 1968. 

During his high school career he was an All-State All Conference tackle and played in the 1957 Mississippi High School All Star game.
While in college he played in the Senior Bowl (1962) and in the Blue Gray Game (1961). Suggs died on September 5, 2022.

Other honors
Academic All SEC sophomore team - 1958
All-American Academic Team - 1959
The Sporting News All Pro - 1968
Third Down Award  - 1969
Houston Oilers All-Time 30 Year team - 1991
Mississippi State Hall of Fame - 1989
Mississippi Sports Hall of Fame - 2006

See also
Other American Football League players

References

1939 births
2022 deaths
Sportspeople from Hattiesburg, Mississippi
American football offensive tackles
American football defensive ends
Mississippi State Bulldogs football players
Houston Oilers players
American Football League All-Star players
American Football League players